Werner Duttweiler (born 21 November 1939) is a Swiss athlete. He competed in the decathlon at the 1964 Summer Olympics and the 1968 Summer Olympics.

References

1939 births
Living people
Athletes (track and field) at the 1964 Summer Olympics
Athletes (track and field) at the 1968 Summer Olympics
Swiss male pole vaulters
Swiss decathletes
Olympic athletes of Switzerland
Place of birth missing (living people)